"HidayahMu" (Your Guidance) is a single recorded by international Malaysian singer-songwriter Shila Amzah. It was released on June 15, 2017, through her independent recording label and management company, Shilala (HK) Limited. The song was solely written by Shila Amzah and produced by a famous Malaysian record producer, Helen Yap. The single was released in conjunction with the Ramadan month and served as Shila's debut single in Islamic music.

Format and track listing

Credits and personnel 
Recording and management 
 Recorded, mixed and mastered at NAR Records (Kuala Lumpur, Malaysia)
 Shilala (HK) Limited (Hong Kong)
Personnel
 Shila Amzah – lead vocals, writer, composer 
 Helen Yap – producer, arranger
 Haslan Hussain – backup vocal
 Juanita Ismail – backup vocal
 Bong Kamal Ali – bass
 Nasran Nawi – strings
 Lim Jae Sern –  strings
 Veronika Thoene – strings
 Rizal Halim – musician
 Amir Sulaiman – audio engineer
 Cl Toh – mastering
Credits are adapted from Helen Yap's Instagram post.

Release history

References 

2016 singles
2016 songs
Shila Amzah songs
Songs written by Shila Amzah